Flavien Dupont (February 13, 1847 – March 12, 1898) was a Canadian notary and political figure in Quebec. He represented Bagot in the Legislative Assembly of Quebec from 1876 to 1878 and Bagot in the House of Commons of Canada from 1882 to 1898 as a Conservative member.

Life
He was born in Saint-Simon, Canada East, the son of Flavien Dupont and Nathalie Fournier. Dupont was educated at the Séminaire de Saint-Hyacinthe, was admitted as a notary in 1873 and set up practice at Saint-Liboire. He served as secretary-treasurer for Bagot County from 1874 to 1898 and was also secretary-treasurer for the Society for Agriculture and Colonization of Bagot County. Dupont was elected to the provincial assembly in an 1876 by-election held after his uncle Pierre-Samuel Gendron was named prothonotary for the Quebec Superior Court; he was defeated when he ran for reelection in 1878. He was elected to the House of Commons in an 1882 by-election held after Joseph-Alfred Mousseau became Quebec premier. He died in office in Sherbrooke at the age of 51.

Electoral record 
 
  
|Conservative
|Flavien Dupont
|align="right"|1,408 
 
|Unknown
|O. Desmarais
|align="right"|1,107

References 
 
 

1847 births
1898 deaths
Members of the House of Commons of Canada from Quebec
Conservative Party of Canada (1867–1942) MPs
Conservative Party of Quebec MNAs